Jorge Fernando Brito Bernardo (born 25 September 1991) is a Portuguese footballer who plays for F.C. Alverca, as a right defender.

Club career
He made his professional debut in the Segunda Liga for Atlético CP on 6 May 2012 in a game against União da Madeira.

References

External links
 
 

1991 births
Footballers from Lisbon
Living people
Portuguese footballers
Association football defenders
Atlético Clube de Portugal players
GS Loures players
G.D. Vitória de Sernache players
Casa Pia A.C. players
Real S.C. players
U.D. Vilafranquense players
F.C. Alverca players
Liga Portugal 2 players